The Nesher Ramla Homo group are an extinct population of archaic humans who lived during the Middle Pleistocene in what is now modern-day Israel. In 2010, evidence of a tool industry had been discovered during a year of archaeological excavations at the  site. In 2021, the first Nesher Ramla Homo individual was identified from remains discovered during further excavations.

Taxonomy

The Nesher Ramla site was discovered in a karst depression following quarrying from a nearby cement factory. The site was excavated by archaeologists between 2010–2011 and yielded artefacts in archaeological deposits from the Middle Paleolithic that were reported by D. Friesem, Y. Zaidner, and R. Shahack-Gross. Evidence of a lithic industry was found during the excavation. The artefacts from the site contained Levallois tools and lithic cores.

Later excavations led by anthropologist Israel Hershkovitz in 2021 led to the discovery of five pieces of a braincase and a nearly-complete lower jaw. The remains were dated to 140–120 kya, during the Middle Pleistocene. 

Hershkovitz speculated that the specimen might be categorised as among the last survivors of a population that would contribute to the Neanderthals and East Asian Homo. Philip Rightmire of Harvard University did not agree with the findings, believing instead that properly, the skull should be categorised as among early Neanderthals. Rightmire also discussed the possibility of a Neanderthal population having migrated to the area from Europe. Yoel Rak of Tel Aviv University stated that the mandible bore characteristics typical of a Neanderthal, and that the specimen itself should be classified as a Neanderthal.

Artefacts

More than 6,000 stone tools were excavated in the fossil-bearing sediment of the site. The Nesher Ramla Homo population mastered stone tool production technologies previously known among Neanderthals and Homo sapiens. The team led by Zaidner interpreted the presence of this tool industry as evidence of cultural interactions between Nesher Ramla populations and Homo sapiens populations.

See also

References

Further reading

2021 archaeological discoveries
Prehistoric mammals of Asia
Fossil taxa described in 2021
Prehistoric Israel
Middle Paleolithic
Anthropology